Veronica rivalis, synonym Hebe acutiflora, the Northland river koromiko, is a species of plant in the family Plantaginaceae. It is endemic to the north island of New Zealand.

References

rivalis
Flora of New Zealand
Taxa named by Leonard Cockayne